Abrosimovo is a rural locality (a village) in Opochetsky District, Pskov Oblast, Russia. The population was 3 as of 2016.

Geography 
Abrosimovo is located 24 km south of Opochka (the district's administrative centre) by road. Boldino is the nearest rural locality.

References 

Rural localities in Pskov Oblast